Elston Howard Turner Sr. (born June 10, 1959) is an American former professional basketball player who currently works as an assistant coach for the Minnesota Timberwolves of the National Basketball Association (NBA).

Playing career
A 6'5" (1.96 m) shooting guard–small forward from the University of Mississippi, leading Ole Miss to its first ever NCAA Tournament in his senior year, Turner was selected in the second round (43rd overall) of the 1981 NBA draft by the Dallas Mavericks, and went on to play in eight NBA seasons from 1981 to 1989, for the Mavericks, Denver Nuggets and the Chicago Bulls. He also coached and played in the CBA — as an assistant coach for the Quad City Thunder and as a player–coach for the Chicago Rockers. He also played professionally in Europe.

Coaching career
Turner later moved to the NBA, with the Sacramento Kings (six years) and the Portland Trail Blazers (four). In 2007, he rejoined Rick Adelman's staff at the Houston Rockets.

In May 2008, Turner was interviewed twice for the Phoenix Suns' head coaching position which had become vacant after Mike D'Antoni left. Ultimately, he was not hired.

In July 2009, Turner was interviewed for the vacant Minnesota Timberwolves head coaching position. Turner, along with Mark Jackson and Los Angeles Lakers assistant Kurt Rambis, was one of three finalists vying for the job, but Rambis was the Wolves' ultimate choice.

In May 2010, Turner was interviewed for both the Philadelphia 76ers' and the Chicago Bulls' vacant head coaching positions. They were eventually taken by Doug Collins and Tom Thibodeau, respectively. In June 2010, Turner was granted permission by the Rockets to talk to the L.A. Clippers about its vacant head coaching job.

In July 2011, Turner was interviewed for a defensive coordinator position for the Phoenix Suns along with the Milwaukee Bucks' coordinator Jim Boylan, the San Antonio Spurs' coordinator Don Newman, and current Golden State Warriors' coordinator Pete Myers. Turner signed a two-year contract, becoming the fifth assistant head coach for the Suns along with Bill Cartwright, Dan Majerle, Igor Kokoškov, and Noel Gillespie.

In July 2012, Turner was interviewed for the Portland Trail Blazers' vacant head coach position. He was one of the final four candidates, competing against Terry Stotts, Steve Clifford, and then-interim coach Kaleb Canales. Ultimately, he was not hired for the position. In January 2013, Turner resigned from his assistant coach position with Phoenix. He was named an assistant coach by the Memphis Grizzlies in September 2013.

On June 3, 2016, Turner joined the Sacramento Kings as an assistant coach once more.

On June 27, 2019, he returned to the Houston Rockets as the lead assistant coach who was added to focus on running defense—former assistant Jeff Bzdelik’s role.

On August 31, 2021, Turner joined the Minnesota Timberwolves as an assistant coach.

Personal
Turner's son, Elston Jr., played guard for the University of Washington Huskies men's basketball team from 2008 through 2010.  He has transferred to the Texas A&M University Aggies for his junior and senior seasons.

Notes

External links
NBA.com coachfile
Stats at BasketballReference
Basketpedya career data

1959 births
Living people
20th-century African-American sportspeople
21st-century African-American people
African-American basketball coaches
African-American basketball players
American expatriate basketball people in Greece
American expatriate basketball people in Italy
American expatriate basketball people in Spain
American men's basketball players
Apollon Patras B.C. players
Basketball coaches from Tennessee
Basketball players from Knoxville, Tennessee
Chicago Bulls players
Chicago Rockers players
Continental Basketball Association coaches
Dallas Mavericks draft picks
Dallas Mavericks players
Denver Nuggets players
Houston Rockets assistant coaches
Liga ACB players
Minnesota Timberwolves assistant coaches
Memphis Grizzlies assistant coaches
Ole Miss Rebels men's basketball players
Phoenix Suns assistant coaches
Portland Trail Blazers assistant coaches
Sacramento Kings assistant coaches
Shooting guards
Small forwards
Sportspeople from Knoxville, Tennessee
Victoria Libertas Pallacanestro players
Wichita Falls Texans players